Mohamed Fawzi may refer to:
Mohamed Fawzi (general) (1915–2000), Egyptian general
Mohamed Fawzi (musician) (1918–1966), Egyptian composer and singer
Mohamed Fawzi (footballer) (born 1990), Emirati football player

See also
Mahmoud Fawzi (1900–1981), Egyptian diplomat and political figure
Mohamed Fawzy (born 1993), Egyptian football player
Fauzi Mohammed Ayub, Lebanese-Canadian Hisbollah member
Fawzi
Muhammad (disambiguation)